Heerlen De Kissel was a railway station in Heerlen, Netherlands.

History
The station opened on 9 December 2007. It is located on the Sittard–Herzogenrath railway and is part of the Heuvellandlijn. Train services were operated by Arriva. As of the timetable change in december 2018 the station was closed.

External links
NS website 
Dutch public transport travel planner 

Kissel
Railway stations opened in 2007
Railway stations on the Heuvellandlijn